The Joint Committee on the Promotion of Democratic Government (abbreviated 民促會; JGPDG) was an umbrella organisation representing various groups of the pro-democracy movement in Hong Kong. It was established on 27 October 1986 by 190 groups and led by the prominent pro-democracy figures Szeto Wah and Martin Lee, two members in the Hong Kong Basic Law Drafting Committee (BLDC), pushing for a faster pace of democratisation in the drafting of the Basic Law of Hong Kong.

For the transition period up to 1997, the committee demanded direct election in the 1988 Legislative Council, a "through train" arrangement for letting Legislative Council members elected in 1995 automatically becoming the members of the first legislature in the SAR government after 1997. They also demanded the Chief Executive to be elected by universal suffrage. 

The committee formed the backbone of today's pro-democracy camp as many of its key members formed the Hong Kong Alliance in Support of Patriotic Democratic Movements in China during the Tiananmen protests of 1989 and the United Democrats of Hong Kong (later transformed into Democratic Party) for the first direct election in 1991.

Members
Source:

Political groups
 Association for Democracy and Justice
 China–Hong Kong Society
 Christian Communist Critics
 Hong Kong Affairs Society
 Hong Kong Association for Democracy and People's Livelihood
 Hong Kong Policy Viewers
 Hong Kong Society for the Advancement of Justice
 Meeting Point
 New Hong Kong Society
 Pei Shum Society
 Sam Fong Society

Educational bodies
 Education Action Group
 Hong Kong Professional Teachers' Union
 Hong Kong Education Research Group
 Technical Institute Teachers' Association

Unions and labour organisations
 Association of Government Land and Engineering Surveying Officers
 Association for Accident Victims
 Federation of Civil Service Unions
 Government Construction Technology and Survey
 Government Cookers' Union
 Government Surveyor Association 
 Hong Kong Christian Industrial Committee

Religious bodies
 Hong Kong Christian Sentinels
 Kowloon West Community Church
 Kwun Tong Community Church
 Public Policy Committee, Hong Kong Christian Council

Student bodies
 Current Affairs Committee, Students Union, CUHK
 Current Affairs Committee, Students Union, HKP
 Current Affairs Committee, Students Union, HKU
 Hong Kong Federation of Students
 Hong Kong Students Christian Movement
 Social Services Group, Student Union, Shue Yan College
 Student Union, Hong Kong Baptist College

Social services and social workers' unions
 Hong Kong Social Workers General Union
 Kwun Tong Methodist Community Centre
 Methodist Epworth Village Community Centre
 On Wing Social Services Centre
 Salvation Army Employees' Association
 Workers Association, HK Federation of Youth Groups

Community groups
 Association for Better Living in Butterfly Bay
 Cha Kwoa Lane THA Resident's Association
 Choi Hung Estate Residents Association
 Concern Group for Development of Southern District
 District board member's Office, Chan Chi-keung
 District board member's Office, Chan Yuen-sum
 District board member's Office, Cheng Kam-wah
 District board member's Office, Cheung Ka-man
 District board member's Office, Choi Cheung Yuet-lan
 District board member's Office, Choi Wai-shek
 District board member's Office, Hung Wing-tat
 District board member's Office, Lai Kwok-hung
 District board member's Office, Lee Chi-fai
 District board member's Office, Li Wah-ming
 District board member's Office, Lee Yuk-wah
 District board member's Office, Liu Sing-lee
 District board member's Office, Luk King-shing
 District board member's Office, Luk Shun-tim
 District board member's Office, Mok Ying-fan
 District board member's Office, Ng Kin-sang
 District board member's Office, Ng Wai-lo
 District board member's Office, Sin Chung-kai
 District board member's Office, Tang Sun-wah
 District board member's Office, Tse Man-kai
 District board member's Office, Tsui Kim-ling
 District board member's Office, Wong Chi-kwan
 District board member's Office, Wong Chung-chuen
 District board member's Office, Wong Yiu-chung
 District board member's Office, Yeung Mei-kwong
 District board member's Office, Yim Tin-sang
 District board member's Office, Chan Mo-pau & Yeung Shuk-chuen
 District board member's Office, Chu Wai-bun & Ng Ming-yum
 Hong Kong Society of Community Organisation
 Hong Kong People's Council on Housing Policy
 Joint Committee of Community Organisation on Concerning Basic Law
 Kowloon City Development Council
 Lai King Estate Residents Association
 Regional Council Member's Office, Tsang Kwok-yuen
 Regional Council Member's Office, Wong Man-tai
 Regional Council & District board member's Office, Lai Kam-cheung & Lee Ho-fai
 Regional Council & District board member's Office, Lai On-kwok & Lee Wing-tat
 Research Centre on the Development of Central & Western District
 Shamshuipo Development and Service Centre
 Shamshuipo People's Livelihood Concern Group
 Shatin Concern Group
 Society for the Rights of Butterfly Bay's Residents
 Tsing Yi Concern Group
 Tuen Mun People's Livelihood Concern Association
 Tuen Mun Tsuen Wai Voluntary Society
 Urban Council Member's Office, Fok Pui-yee
 Urban Council Member's Office, Lam Chak-piu
 Urban Council Member's Office, Lee Chik-yuet
 Urban Council Member's Office, Tong Kam-piu
 Urban Council & District board members' Office, Fung Kin-kee, Leung Kam-to, Tam Kwok-kiu
 Yaumatei Community Research Group

See also
 1988 Hong Kong electoral reform
 Group of 190

References

Politics of Hong Kong
Chinese democracy movements
1986 establishments in Hong Kong
1989 disestablishments in Hong Kong